Labiostrombus epidromis, common name the swan conch, is a species of sea snail, a marine gastropod mollusk in the family Strombidae, the true conchs.

Description
The typical  size of the adult shell varies between 50 and 95 mm.

Distribution
This marine species occurs in the Central Indo-West Pacific,;off the Ryukyus, Japan, to  Australia (Northern Territory, Queensland, Western Australia), and New Caledonia

Phylogeny

In 2006, Latiolais and colleagues proposed a cladogram (a tree of descent) that attempts to show the phylogenetic relationships of 34 species within the family Strombidae. The authors analysed 31 species in the genus Strombus including Labiostrombus epidromis (referred to as Strombus epidromis in their analysis), and three species in the allied genus Lambis. The cladogram was based on DNA sequences of both nuclear histone H3 and mitochondrial cytochrome-c oxidase I (COI) protein-coding gene regions. In this proposed phylogeny, Strombus epidromis (= Labiostrombus epidromis), Strombus vittatus (= Doxander vittatus) and Strombus canarium (= Laevistrombus canarium) are closely related and appear to share a common ancestor.

References

 Cotton, B.C. 1953. No. 3. Strombidae. Adelaide : Royal Society of South Australia, Malacological Section 4 pp. 1 pl. [
 Abbott, R.T. 1960. The genus Strombus in the Indo-Pacific. Indo-Pacific Mollusca 1(2): 33-146
 Wilson, B. 1993. Australian Marine Shells. Prosobranch Gastropods. Kallaroo, Western Australia : Odyssey Publishing Vol. 1 408 pp.
 Kreipl, K. & Poppe, G.T. 1999. A Conchological Iconography: The Family Strombidae. Hackenheim, Germany : ConchBooks 59 pp., 130 pls. 
 Raven, H 2002. Notes on molluscs from NW Borneo. 1. Stromboidea (Gastropoda, Strombidae, Rostellariidae, Seraphidae). Vita Malacologica 1: 3-32

External links
 Linnaeus, C. (1758). Systema Naturae per regna tria naturae, secundum classes, ordines, genera, species, cum characteribus, differentiis, synonymis, locis. Editio decima, reformata. Laurentius Salvius: Holmiae. ii, 824 pp

Strombidae
Gastropods described in 1758
Taxa named by Carl Linnaeus